Jouni Johannes Grönman (born 17 May 1962), is a Finnish former weightlifter who competed at four Olympic Games won a bronze medal at the 1984 Summer Olympics in Los Angeles.

Grönman was born and trained in Pori, on the west coast of Finland.

A lightweight, he was a 15-time Finnish champion and won five Nordic titles. He started competing internationally as a weightlifter 1983, with a fifth placing at the European Championships and was sixth at the World Championships. He won a silver medal at the 1984 European Championships, which was followed soon after by his first appearance in the Olympics.

Olympic career
Due to the Soviet boycott, the top four placed lifters from the World Championships were absent for the 1984 Olympics, so Grönman came into the event as one of the favourites. He had the final lift of the competition and although he got bar to his shoulders was unable to get it over his head to better China's Yao Jingyuan. Instead he won a bronze medal with an earlier 312.5 kg effort, the same total of the silver medalist Andrei Socaci, who got second place on account of his body weight being less than Grönman's. It was only the second Olympics that Finland had won a weightlifting medal, he and heavyweight lifter Pekka Niemi's bronze medals were the first since Kaarlo Kangasniemi won gold in 1968.

He represented Finland in a further three Olympics. In 1988 he did not register a successful lift, but in 1992 he finished in fifth position overall. His final appearance came in 1996 and he was the oldest competitor in the field at the age of 34. He finished in 17th position.

References

External links
Jouni Grönman at Sports-Reference

1962 births
Living people
Finnish male weightlifters
Olympic weightlifters of Finland
Olympic bronze medalists for Finland
Medalists at the 1984 Summer Olympics
Weightlifters at the 1984 Summer Olympics
Weightlifters at the 1988 Summer Olympics
Weightlifters at the 1992 Summer Olympics
Weightlifters at the 1996 Summer Olympics
Sportspeople from Pori
Olympic medalists in weightlifting